Rokas is a Lithuanian masculine given name. Notable people with the name include. 
Rokas Čepanonis (born 1986), Lithuanian basketball player
Rokas Giedraitis (born 1992), Lithuanian basketball player
Rokas Guščinas (born 1991), Lithuanian artistic gymnast
Rokas Jokubaitis (born 2000), Lithuanian basketball player
Rokas Kostiuškevičius (born 1990), Lithuanian balloonist
Rokas Masiulis (born 1969), Lithuanian politician
Rokas Milevičius (born 1986), Lithuanian yacht sport sailor
Rokas Zaveckas (born 1996), Lithuanian alpine skier
Rokas Žilinskas (1972–2017), Lithuanian journalist and politician
Rokas Zubovas (born 1966), Lithuanian pianist

As a surname:
Efstathios Rokas (born 1984), Greek footballer

References

Lithuanian masculine given names